The Cantons of Ecuador are the second-level subdivisions of Ecuador, below the provinces. There are 221 cantons in the country, of which three are not in any province. The cantons are further sub-divided into parishes, which are classified as either urban or rural. Below is a list of cantons by province.

Azuay Province

Bolívar Province

Cañar Province

Carchi Province

Chimborazo Province

Cotopaxi Province

El Oro Province

Esmeraldas Province

Galápagos Province

Guayas Province

Imbabura Province

Loja Province

Los Ríos Province

Manabí Province

Morona-Santiago Province

Napo Province

Orellana Province

Pastaza Province

Pichincha Province

Santa Elena Province

Santo Domingo de los Tsáchilas Province

Sucumbíos Province

Tungurahua Province

Zamora-Chinchipe Province

No provinces
There are or were four areas that are non-delimited. These locations are:
 Las Golondrinas: In a referendum held on April 3, 2016, 56.9% of voters voted in favor of Las Golondrinas being incorporated into the Imbabura Province.
 La Manga del Cura: In a referendum held on September 27, 2015, 64.2% of the voters voted in favor of La Manga del Cura being incorporated into the Manabí Province.
 El Piedrero (surrounded by Guayas and Cañar)
 Matilde Esther (surrounded by Los Ríos, Guayas and Bolívar)

Authorities 
In each canton there is a jefe político, chosen by, and representing the interests of, the president. There is also a mayor (alcalde) and a municipal council (concejo municipal), chosen by popular vote.

See also
Provinces of Ecuador

References

Statoids: Cantons of Ecuador

 
Subdivisions of Ecuador
Ecuador, Cantons
Cantons, Ecuador
Ecuador geography-related lists